The 27th edition of the annual Hypo-Meeting took place on May 26 and May 27, 2001 in Götzis, Austria. The track and field competition, featuring a decathlon (men) and a heptathlon (women) event, was part of the 2001 IAAF World Combined Events Challenge. Roman Šebrle set a world record in the men's decathlon with 9026 points.

Men's Decathlon

Schedule

May 26 

May 27

Records

Results

Women's Heptathlon

Schedule

May 26

May 27

Records

Results

Notes

See also
2001 Decathlon Year Ranking
2001 World Championships in Athletics - Men's Decathlon
Athletics at the 2001 Summer Universiade - Men's Decathlon
2001 World Championships in Athletics – Women's heptathlon

References
 decathlon2000
 IAAF results
 athledunet 

2001
Hypo-Meeting
Hypo-Meeting